Colasposoma tibiale is a species of leaf beetle of East Africa and the Democratic Republic of the Congo. It was first described from Lake Nyassa by Joseph Sugar Baly in 1878.

References 

tibiale
Beetles of the Democratic Republic of the Congo
Taxa named by Joseph Sugar Baly
Insects of East Africa
Beetles described in 1878